Universiti Tenaga Nasional (UNITEN) is a private university, located in Selangor, Malaysia, with GLC university status. It is wholly owned by the public-listed Tenaga Nasional Berhad (TNB), established in 1997.

History
Universiti Tenaga Nasional commenced operation in 1976 as Institut Latihan Sultan Ahmad Shah (ILSAS), which served for many years as the corporate training center for Tenaga Nasional Berhad (TNB) and its predecessor, the National Electricity Board. In 1994, ILSAS was transformed into an institute of higher learning and renamed Institut Kejuruteraan Teknologi Tenaga Nasional (IKATAN). It offered academic programmes in engineering and business management at undergraduate and graduate levels through twinning links with local and foreign universities (Indiana-University, Purdue University Indianapolis, US for Engineering). In 1997, IKATAN was upgraded to Universiti Tenaga Nasional.

Principal Officers 
The Chancellor of Universiti Tenaga Nasional was appointed on 9 March 2005. The person holding this position is Tun Abdul Rahman Abbas.

Tan Sri Dr Leo Moggie was appointed Chairman of the Tenaga Nasional Berhad and Sabah Electricity Sdn Bhd, two companies that supply electricity to the vast majority of Malaysia. He was appointed to the Board of the NSTP Company on 27 February 2008. He is a member of the Board of Directors of Digi.Com Berhad. He was appointed to the Board of the NSTP Company on 27 February 2008. He is a member of the Board of Directors of Digi.Com Berhad.

Campuses 
Universiti Tenaga Nasional operates from two campuses; one is the main campus in Putrajaya, and the other is in Bandar Muadzam Shah.

Putrajaya (main campus) 
This campus is 25 miles to the south of Kuala Lumpur near Kajang in Selangor, and has an area of 214 hectares. It is near the Cyberjaya Multimedia Super Corridor and adjacent to Putrajaya, the administrative center of the Federal Government of Malaysia. All engineering, information technology and other technology courses are held at this campus.

Sultan Haji Ahmad Shah (branch campus) 
This branch is located at Bandar Muadzam Shah, Pahang. It officially opened on 4 May 2001. The campus offers Accounting, Finance, Entrepreneurship, Marketing, Human Resources, and Business courses.

Colleges and departments

College of Engineering (COE)

College of Business and Accounting (COBA)

College of Computing & Informatics (CCI)

College of Energy Economics & Social Sciences (CES)

College of Graduate Studies (COGS)

Notable alumni

Rankings

Quacquarelli Symonds (QS)

Times Higher Education (THE)

See also
 List of universities in Malaysia

References

External links 

 

Universities and colleges in Selangor
Educational institutions established in 1976
Educational institutions established in 1999
Business schools in Malaysia
Engineering universities and colleges in Malaysia
Information technology schools in Malaysia
1976 establishments in Malaysia
1999 establishments in Malaysia
Kajang
Private universities and colleges in Malaysia